A Chance of Snow is an American Christmas TV movie starring JoBeth Williams and Michael Ontkean. It premiered on Lifetime Television on December 7, 1998. As of 2009, it was shown in the 25 Days of Christmas programming block on ABC Family, but it was not shown in 2010. This film is directed by Tony Bill.

Plot
The movie revolves around Maddie Parker, who is on the verge of divorcing her sportswriter husband, Matt Parker, after his brief, extra-marital affair.
 
When the snow fall has affects flights at the Minneapolis–Saint Paul International Airport on Christmas Eve, Maddie and Matt find themselves included with the many passengers who are stranded at the terminal. This gives them ample time to talk about their relationship and rediscover love through second chances.

Cast
JoBeth Williams as Madeline "Maddie" Parker-Hill
Michael Ontkean as Matthew "Matt" Hill
Barbara Barrie as Ruth Pulmer
Dey Young as Katherine Parker
Peter Syvertsen as Craig Johnson
Dina Merrill as Merilee Parker
Charles Durning as Earl Pulmer

Reception
On Radio Times, the film has a 2/5 rating.

See also
 List of Christmas films

References

External links
 

1998 television films
1998 films
1990s Christmas drama films
American Christmas drama films
Christmas television films
Films set in Minnesota
Films shot in Minnesota
Lifetime (TV network) films
Films directed by Tony Bill
Films scored by Van Dyke Parks
American drama television films
1990s English-language films
1990s American films